Hannah Martin is a character on the soap opera Neighbours.

Hannah Martin may also refer to:

 Hannah Martin (field hockey) (born 1994), British field hockey player
 Hannah Martin (judoka), American judoka
 Hannah Martin (footballer) (born 1996), Australian rules footballer
 Hannah Martin (volleyball) (born 1990), Australian volleyball player
 Hannah Martin, English folk musician, part of Edgelarks

See also
 Martin Hannah (1865–1953), Australian politician